Indira Gandhi Stadium is a football stadium in Kohima, Nagaland. Opened in 2003, the stadium hosts major regional football matches including The Northeast T. Ao Trophy and NSF Martyrs Trophy. With 20,000 seats, it is the largest stadium in Nagaland.

History
The stadium is named after Indira Gandhi, the third Prime Minister of India and also the first and, to date, the only female Prime Minister of India. The foundation stone of the stadium was laid by her son Rajiv Gandhi on 6 October 1987 and it was inaugurated on 28 October 2003 by the then Prime Minister of India Atal Bihari Vajpayee.

Stadium
The stadium was built by Nagaland firm Vilelie Khamo & Sons.

References

2003 establishments in Nagaland
2003 establishments in India
Sports venues in Nagaland
Football venues in Nagaland
Kohima